Simonluca Agazzone (23 July 1981 – 1 October 2020) was an Italian professional footballer.

Death 
Agazzone died on 1 October 2020 in Carpignano Sesia following a car crash, at the age of 39. Another footballer, 32-year-old Matteo Ravetto, also died in the crash. Before that he played for several third division clubs.

References

External links
 
  Simonluca Agazzone at stresasportiva.com

1981 births
2020 deaths
Italian footballers
Italy youth international footballers
S.P.A.L. players
A.C. Monza players
Spezia Calcio players
Novara F.C. players
Carrarese Calcio players
F.C. Südtirol players
A.C. Legnano players
Association football midfielders
Mediterranean Games silver medalists for Italy
Mediterranean Games medalists in football
Competitors at the 2001 Mediterranean Games

Road incident deaths in Italy
People from Borgomanero